Set 'Em Wild, Set 'Em Free is the fourth album by Akron/Family. It was released on May 5, 2009, by Dead Oceans Records (and in Europe by Crammed Discs). On February 15, 2009, Set 'Em Wild, Set 'Em Free leaked on the internet.

Track listing
 "Everyone Is Guilty" - 5:58
 "River" - 4:46
 "Creatures" - 4:13
 "The Alps & Their Orange Evergreen" - 3:51
 "Set 'Em Free, Pt.1" - 2:37
 "Gravelly Mountains of the Moon" - 7:41
 "Many Ghosts" - 4:05
 "MBF" - 3:14
 "They Will Appear" - 6:28
 "Sun Will Shine (Warmth of the Sunship version)" - 5:13
 "Last Year" - 1:40

Charts

References

Akron/Family albums
2009 albums
Dead Oceans albums